Al-Qāsim ibn Hārūn al-Rashīd was an Abbasid prince, the third son of the Abbasid caliph Harun al-Rashid (r. 786–809), and for a time third-in-line to the Abbasid throne.

Biography
Qasim was Harun's third son, born to a slave mother named Qasif. Sukaynah, Harun's eldest daughter, was also Qasim's full sister. In his youth, Qasim was placed under the tutorship of the influential general Abd al-Malik ibn Salih. Thanks to Abd al-Malik's influence with Harun, Qasim was named as third in line of succession in 802 or 803, shortly after the so-called "Meccan documents" which established the precedence in succession of his elder brothers Muhammad (the caliph al-Amin) and Abdallah (the caliph al-Ma'mun). On this occasion, Qasim also received the honorific epithet al-Mu'tamin, but Harun also stipulated that Abdallah could, once caliph, alter the succession in favour of his own sons. In addition, Harun entrusted Qasim with the command over the frontier provinces with the Byzantine Empire (the ), with his seat at Manbij.

In this capacity, in July-August 803, Qasim led a raid into Byzantine Asia Minor. He besieged the strategic fortress of Koron, while his lieutenant al-Abbas ibn Ja'far ibn Muhammad ibn al-Ash'ath was dispatched to besiege another fortress, known to the Arabs as Sinan. The Byzantines, however, offered to release 320 Muslim prisoners if he departed, to which he agreed. In February 808, when Harun departed his residence Raqqa for his second expedition to Khurasan, he left Qasim behind as his deputy in Raqqa, with Khuzayma ibn Khazim as his advisor. Eventually, in 810, Qasim was removed by al-Amin from all his governorships in favour of Khuzayma, and brought to live under close supervision in Baghdad. Amin shortly after forbade his brother's mention in the prayers, along with Abdallah al-Ma'mun, who had risen in near-revolt in Khurasan. In the civil war that followed, al-Ma'mun was triumphant, defeating and killing his brother al-Amin in 813. Immediately after, Qasim was formally deposed from his position as successor.

References

Sources
 
 

8th-century births
9th-century deaths
Abbasid people of the Arab–Byzantine wars
Heirs apparent who never acceded
Generals of the Abbasid Caliphate
Sons of Harun al-Rashid
Abbasid governors of Qinnasrin
8th-century Arabs
9th-century Arabs